Seven Ways from Sundown is a 1960 American Western film directed by Harry Keller and starring Audie Murphy and Barry Sullivan. It is based on the novel of the same name by Clair Huffaker, who also wrote the script. Young cast member Teddy Rooney is the son of actors Mickey Rooney and Martha Vickers.

Plot
Seven Jones (Murphy) is a young Texas Ranger on his first assignment, following in the footsteps of his brother, Two Jones, who was also a Ranger.

He initially comes across a town that try to attack him, who are angry at the lack of support from Texas Rangers. He learns that the town had just been attacked by outlaw Jim Flood (Sullivan), who had killed two men in a shoot out over a card game, and burnt down the saloon.

Jones reports for duty at the Texas Rangers headquarters, and it is revealed Jones's brother, Two, was also a Ranger there. Here he meets a woman, Joy (Venetia Stevenson) who is the daughter of the lady who looks after the Rangers' meals, and he starts to fall for her.
However, he is soon sent to capture Flood, who it is revealed is a legendary gunslinger and is something of a Western folk hero. He is dispatched on the mission with a more experienced Ranger, Sergeant Hennessy (John McIntire)  by the Lieutenant, Herly (Kenneth Tobey).
Hennessey protests that it is unusual that a new recruit be sent on such a mission after such a dangerous man, but Herly insists.

They track Flood for some days, however, as they get close to Flood, he ambushes them and shoots Hennessey from close range. Hennessy orders Jones to turn back, but he refuses, and Hennessey dies. Jones buries him, and he continues on.

Despite his inexperience, Jones manages to capture the outlaw, but he soon finds that transporting him to prison will not be easy. Flood, though easygoing in his manner, warns Jones that he will never be locked up again, but Jones is determined to take him back to Texas, and to justice. Flood has opportunities to kill Jones, but instead continues on the journey, all the while insisting that he will never be put back in jail. Along the way, several people for various reasons want to either kill the young Ranger and Flood. Flood is extremely popular in some towns, who want to free him, while others want to kill him for his past deeds, or for the bounty. It is revealed that Flood has an extensive criminal history, having escaped jail multiple times and the noose twice.

As the Ranger and his prisoner make their dangerous journey, they occasionally have to work together to survive. They form a grudging respect for each other, almost a friendship, but they know that in the end they are on opposite sides of the law.

Cast
 Audie Murphy as Seven Jones
 Barry Sullivan as Jim Flood
 Venetia Stevenson as Joy Karrington
 John McIntire as Sergeant Henessey
 Kenneth Tobey as Lieutenant Herly
 Mary Field as Ma Karrington
 Ken Lynch as Graves
 Suzanne Lloyd as Lucinda
 Ward Ramsey as Fogarty
 Don Collier as Duncan
 Jack Kruschen as Beeker
 Claudia Barrett as Gilda
 Teddy Rooney as Jody
 Don Haggerty as Durton
 Robert Burton as Eavens
 Fred Graham as Chief Waggoner
 Dale Van Sickel as 2nd Waggoner (as Dale Van Sickle)

Production
The film was originally directed by George Sherman. Parts of the film were shot in St. George, Utah. During filming in the studio, shortly after the unit had returned from location work outside Las Vegas, Sherman and Audie Murphy had an argument over a line reading, which resulted in Murphy pushing Sherman over and threatening to kill him. Sherman left the project and was replaced for the remainder of the shoot by Harry Keller. Murphy started an affair with co-star Venetia Stevenson, which lasted for a year.

See also
 List of American films of 1960

References

External links
 
 
 

1960 films
Audie Murphy
Films based on American novels
1960 Western (genre) films
American Western (genre) films
Films directed by Harry Keller
Films scored by William Lava
Films shot in Utah
Universal Pictures films
1960s English-language films
1960s American films